Frank Emerson Shannon (November 25, 1917 – December 20, 2005) was an American professional basketball player. He served as a player-coach for the Youngstown Bears in the National Basketball League during the 1946–47 season. Shannon was also a long-time high school and college coach in Ohio, serving at several different high schools as well as Ohio Wesleyan University.

References

External links
 Ohio Wesleyan Hall of Fame profile
 Wittenberg Hall of Fame profile
 Oho Basketball Hall of Fame profile

1917 births
2005 deaths
United States Navy personnel of World War II
Basketball coaches from Ohio
Basketball coaches from West Virginia
American men's basketball players
Basketball players from Ohio
Basketball players from West Virginia
Guards (basketball)
High school basketball coaches in the United States
Ohio Wesleyan Battling Bishops men's basketball coaches
Player-coaches
Sportspeople from Parkersburg, West Virginia
Youngstown Bears coaches
Youngstown Bears players
Wittenberg Tigers baseball players
Wittenberg Tigers men's basketball players